Shirvan is a historical Iranian region in the eastern Caucasus, now in Azerbaijan. 

Shirvan or Sirvan or variants may also refer to:

Places
 Şirvan, Azerbaijan
 Şirvan, Shamakhi, Azerbaijan
 Sirvan County, Ilam Province, Iran
 Shirvan County, North Khorasan Province, Iran
 Shirvan, Iran
 Shirvan District
 Shirvan Rural District, Borujerd County, Lorestan Province, Iran
 Shirvan, Lorestan
 Sirvan Rural District, Kermanshah Province, Iran
 Şirvan District, in Siirt Province
 Şirvan, Siirt, seat of Şirvan District, Turkey
 Shirvan steppe, part of the Kur-Araz Lowland of Azerbaijan 
 Lerrnakert, Shirak, formerly Shirvan, Armenia

Other uses
 Emirate of Şirvan, a Kurdish emirate
 Sirvan Khosravi (born 1982), an Iranian singer

See also

Shirvani (disambiguation)
Sirwan River, Iran/Iraq